Gregoor is both a given name and a surname. Notable people with the name include:

 Gillis Smak Gregoor (1770–1843), Dutch landscape painter
 Gregoor van Dijk (born 1981), Dutch footballer
 Jan Gregoor (1914–1982), Dutch painter and art educator

Dutch masculine given names
Dutch-language surnames